Richard Goodwin (born 1953 in Sydney) is an Australian artist, architect and professor of Fine Arts and Design at the  University of New South Wales School of Art and Design.

Work 

Goodwin is the director of Richard Goodwin Pty Ltd, a Sydney-based practice that has evolved from performance art to sculpture, installations, parasitic architecture and freeway infrastructure. Goodwin's artwork is held in major collections including the Art Gallery of NSW, Sydney and regional galleries across Australia. He regularly consults on major infrastructure projects such as bridges and freeway walls.

Goodwin's core agenda is creating what he calls "porosity". He argues, "Security seeks to close a city down. Porosity seeks to open it up. Somewhere between the two a solution must be found within our capitalist system. If we can't find the balance, they'll close the cities and cities will die". In practicing this agenda, he tests the functional and aesthetic boundaries of public space through both art and architecture. He has opened up new dimensions in the planning of urban spaces and the way architecture interacts with its physical and cultural context.

In 1996, Goodwin established the Porosity Studio at COFA . The studio enquires into the way patterns of inhabiting and moving through the cities weaves a level of political richness into the fabric of architecture. Since 2004 the studios have been supported by a number of cooperations such as the British Council. They have been run as intensive workshops internationally in cities such as Glasgow, Cardiff, Milan, Beijing and Rotterdam.

The Australian Research Council (ARC)'s prestigious Discovery Grant was awarded to Goodwin in 2002.  The research project argued for 'Porosity' as a way of describing an urban experience which turns the building inside out and de-emphasises the obsession with facades. The outcome of the research opened up an entire new chapter in the way the fabric of the city is viewed by civic authorities. The ARC awarded Richard Goodwin again in 2009 with a Linkage Grant to develop the research further through sensors and gaming engine technologies in collaboration with Russell Lowe and the Emergency Information Coordination Unit (EICU) run under the NSW Department of Lands.

Goodwin is the author of Porosity: the Architecture of Invagination and has published many articles on issues of public space, and chapters in collected works. Moreover, a number of articles and books  have been published on his work.

Major prizes 
 National Sculpture Award (1985)
 Street Story Award for Glebe Island Arterial (2001)
 Sculpture by the Sea Prize (2003)
 Helen Lempriere Award (2004)
 Blackett Award for Shellharbour Workers Club (2004)
 Commendation Urban Design award for RTA Prototype Toilets (2008)
 AIA Tasmania Chapter, Colorbond Award for Wing House (2009)
 Wynne Prize from the Art Gallery of NSW (2011)

References

External links 
 Richard Goodwin Pty Ltd
 Professor Richard Goodwin at Design and Art Australia Online
 Richard Goodwin at Australian Galleries

Academic staff of the University of New South Wales
Living people
Architects from Sydney
1953 births